Iosif Szilaghi (or József Zilahi , born 10 October 1931 - 21.09.2022) was a Romanian fencer. He competed in the team foil event at the 1960 Summer Olympics and shared ninth place.

References

1931 births
2022 deaths
Romanian male fencers
Romanian foil fencers
Olympic fencers of Romania
Fencers at the 1960 Summer Olympics
Sportspeople from Târgu Mureș